James G. Palmer (June 8, 1933 – September 16, 2013) was an American professional basketball player. Palmer was selected in the 1957 NBA Draft (second round, 12th overall) by the St. Louis Hawks.

He played collegiately at the University of Dayton from 1954 to 1957 before embarking on his professional basketball career. His first stop was in the National Industrial Basketball League playing for the Peoria Cats. After one season, Palmer moved on to the National Basketball Association (NBA) in which he played the next three seasons, splitting his career between the Cincinnati Royals and New York Knicks. In his final year of professional ball, Palmer played in the American Basketball League.

Palmer died on September 16, 2013.

References

External links
 Jim Palmer @ TheDraftReview

1933 births
2013 deaths
American men's basketball players
Basketball players from Virginia
Centers (basketball)
Cincinnati Royals players
Dayton Flyers men's basketball players
People from Lee County, Virginia
New York Knicks players
Peoria Caterpillars players
San Francisco Saints players
St. Louis Hawks draft picks